The 2019 Indian general election was held in India on 11 April 2019, along with Telangana, to constitute the 17th Lok Sabha.

Members of Parliament

Results

Assembly segments wise lead of parties

References 

2019 Indian general election
2019 Indian general election by state or union territory
Elections in Telangana
2010s in Telangana